The 4th Battalion, Parachute Regiment (4 PARA), is an Army Reserve unit of the British Army.  Now recruiting across the United Kingdom originally the Battalion covered the North of England, with its headquarters located in Pudsey, West Yorkshire. Following the Options for Change review in 1993, 4 PARA amalgamated with the 15th (Scottish) Battalion of the Parachute Regiment (XV PARA), which was downsized and became 15 (Scottish) Company of 4 PARA. As part of further changes in 1999 (Strategic Defence Review), the Battalion also merged with the 10th (Volunteer) Battalion which then became 10 (London) Company.

Under the Army 2020 plan, it formed a reserve air assault infantry battalion of 16 Air Assault Brigade.

History
The original 4th Parachute Battalion was formed in 1942 and saw service in;
Algeria ( as part of the British 1st Airborne Division during Operation Torch)
Tunisia (Supporting American forces)

In 1943 Operation Avalanche (Invasion of Italy) was launched and the Battalion was in action at  Taranto and Cassino. In August 1944, the battalion was part of Operation Rugby in Southern France. In October 1944 the Battalion seized by airborne assault (Operation Manna) the airfield at Megara near Athens in Greece as part of the 2nd Independent Parachute Brigade. The battalion spent the rest of the war supporting the 2nd New Zealand Division. Then from 1945 served with the 6th Airborne Division in Palestine.

The present day Battalion is the successor to several T.A. Parachute Battalions which were all raised in 1947, although these units were raised during the Second World War either as parachute troops or infantry. These are:-

The 10th Parachute Battalion was a war-formed unit which as part of the British 1st Airborne Division fought at the Battle of Arnhem (Operation Market Garden). During this action Captain Lionel Ernest Queripel was awarded a posthumous Victoria Cross. A new 10th Battalion was raised in 1947 as part of the T.A. based in London.
The 12th (Yorkshire) Parachute Battalion and 13th (Lancashire) Parachute Battalion were based on war formed infantry battalions, the 10th Battalion Green Howards and the 2/4th South Lancashire Regiment respectively. Both were dropped in Normandy as part of the 6th Airborne Division during the 'D' Day landings (Operation Tonga) and on 12 June took part in the action at Breville. In 1945  both battalions took part in Operation Varsity (the Rhine Crossing) with the 6th Airborne Division. Both battalions were re-raised in 1947 in the TA, although with no official lineage to their wartime namesakes. The 12th/13th (Yorkshire and Lancashire) Battalion of the Parachute Regiment was formed in 1956 from an amalgamation of the 12th and 13th Battalions.
The 15th Parachute Battalion was originally raised in 1945 from the 1st battalion King's Regiment (Liverpool). Disbanded at the end of the war it was re raised as art of the T.A. 1947 as the 15th (Scottish) Parachute Battalion with its HQ in Glasgow. One of 15 PARA's past members is the well known Scottish comedian, musician and actor, Billy Connolly. He served in the Glasgow HQ during the early 1960s and later commemorated his TA experiences in the song, " Weekend Soldier". On the right sleeve of the smock worn by XV PARA soldiers just below the wings was a tartan DZ flash. This was similar to that used by the Lowland Scottish Regiments being a section of the Hunting Stewart Tartan. It was also worn on the beret behind the parachute regiment capbadge
The  17th (Durham Light Infantry) Parachute Battalion was raised in 1947 in North East England by converting the 9th Battalion, Durham Light Infantry.

All of the TA Parachute Battalions formed part of the 44th Parachute Brigade (V) which was disbanded on 31 March 1978. While in this brigade 4 PARA was re-formed on 1 April 1967 from a merger of the 12th/13th (Yorkshire and Lancashire) Battalion and the 17th (9 DLI) Battalions of the Parachute Regiment. After this 4 PARA came under the administrative command of North-East District with an operational role to reinforce an armoured division in the British Army of the Rhine (BAOR).

In 1982, 4 PARA became part of 15 Infantry Brigade.

in 1993 15 PARA disbanded and merged with 4 PARA.

In 1999, 10 PARA disbanded and merged with 4 PARA, 4 PARA (Merseyside) was disbanded therefore moving to Pudsey in Leeds, however it moved back to Merseyside (Jubilee Barracks, St Helens) in 2006.

In 2005, 4 PARA deployed a full Company (Cassino Coy, 4 PARA)  to southern Iraq in support of 1 SCOTS and 1 R IRISH ROBG (Rear Ops Battle Group)  on Op Telic 7. Based at Shaiba Log Base (SLB HQ Multi National Division South East) they performed all the company taskings of the Regular Army companies within the ROBG. This was a precursor for the employment of TA Individual Replacements (IRs) and formed TA companies on Op Herrick in Afghanistan. Soldiers of all ranks went on to serve with 16 Air Assault Brigade on Op Herrick, some straight after the Telic tour ended. Of note was the fact that this was the first subunit (company) deployment of 4 PARA soldiers since WW2 on operations and set a precedent for what could be achieved by Army Reserve (AR) soldiers in support of the Regular Army. The OPTAG (Operational Training and Advisory Group) remarked on a visit to SLB on Op Telic 7 that the only difference between the 4 PARA troops and their regular counterparts was 'the colour of their DZ flash'. The Tyne-Tees Regiment and other units also provided soldiers to Cassino Coy, all of whom provided an invaluable contribution to its success. The employment model of integrated AR units within Regular Army Brigades, that  4 PARA led, is now the established model for the  Army 2020 Model. The experience and contribution of 4 PARA soldiers to Op Telic and Op Herrick led the way for Regular/Reserve integration and now sees 4 PARA, 299 Independent Para Squadron  Royal Engineers and 144 Parachute Medical Squadron as fully integrated units within 16 Air Assault Brigade. This has led to the establishment of High Readiness Reserve (HRR) soldiers ready to deploy at short notice in support of the Brigade. 4 PARA and the other AR airborne Units are the highest recruited and trained AR units.

In 2014 D Company 4 PARA was created to cover the Midlands area. The Coy HQ is based at Edward Street, Rugby, with a platoon located at Triumph Road Barracks in Nottingham and a third platoon based in Newport.

Before becoming an actor, Tim Healy was a member of 4 PARA.

Training
The level of fitness required for joining 4 PARA is far higher than the level mandated for other Army Reserve Infantry units and 4 PARA conduct their own recruit training programme independent of Regional Training Centres.

The 16 day Army Reserve Combat Infantry Course (CIC) for 4 PARA is run by the Para Coy staff at ITC Catterick. These high standards are carried on into the battalion, and are maintained by the regular staff posted there for that purpose.

Training evenings (Tuesday night, Wednesday for Nottingham) will usually include a combination of fitness, military skills and admin. One or two weekend exercises per months of ranges, tactics, military skills etc. (9 weekends maximum) before TSC Alpha. Advanced skills in TSC Bravo takes place before P Company and parachute training. Annual camps (one per year, 2 weeks duration) are for longer exercises, parachuting and more advanced range work.

Companies

A Company (Scotland)
Finnieston, Glasgow
Lanark Road, Edinburgh

B Company (Greater London)
Romford, London
White City, London
Croydon, London

C Company (North of England)
Pudsey, Leeds
Hebburn, Tyne & Wear
Altcar Training Camp, Merseyside

D Company (Midlands)
Lenton, Nottingham
Rugby, Warwickshire
Newport, Monmouthshire

Operations and exercises
Overseas annual camps have been held in the Czech Republic 1999 (Ex Czech Mate); France 2001 (Ex Gaulish 1); Germany 2002 (Ex Paperchase); Ukraine 2003 (Ex Cossack Steppe); Wyoming, USA 2005 (Ex Stoney Run) and Albania 2006. In addition the battalion has a number of regular exercises and unit exchanges in which it takes part, including Ex Paperchase (exchange with German 272 Fallschirmjager Battalion); Ex Anthropoid (patrol competition with Slovak Special Forces); Ex Pathfinder (exchange with Czech airborne forces) and Ex Market-Garden (annual commemoration and jump into Arnhem). The battalion also regularly sends teams to the annual Exercise Cambrian Patrol competition held at the Sennybridge Training Area.

A total of 104 soldiers from the battalion were mobilised to reinforce the 1st and 3rd battalions during the invasion of Iraq in 2003 Operation Telic. The battalion provided a platoon for force protection duties on Op Telic 3 in 2004 and a company for Op Telic 7 in 2005–2006. The battalion mobilised soldiers in support of the 2nd and 3rd battalions in Afghanistan on Operation Herrick 4 in 2006, Op Herrick 8 in 2008 and Op Herrick 13 in 2010–2011, as well as in support of the Yorkshire Regiment on Op Herrick 15, and the Royal Tank Regiment on Op Herrick 18. The battalion has also provided soldiers for operations in Northern Ireland and the Balkans.

See also
1st Battalion, The Parachute Regiment
2nd Battalion, The Parachute Regiment
3rd Battalion, The Parachute Regiment
List of Second World War British airborne battalions

References

External links
Archive of 4 PARA

Parachute Regiment
British Parachute Regiment Battalions
Airborne units and formations of the United Kingdom
Pudsey